Panchevo can refer to:

 Pančevo, a city and municipality in Serbia
 Panchevo, Burgas Province, a village in Burgas Province, Bulgaria
 Panchevo, Kardzhali Province in Kardzhali Municipality